Asterropteryx striata, known commonly as the striped goby, is a species of marine fish in the family Gobiidae.

It is widespread throughout the tropical waters of the central Indo-Pacific area.

This fish is a small size that can reach a maximum size of 2.3 cm length.

References

External links
 Marinespecies.org
 Eol.org
 Fishbase.org
 

striata
Fish described in 1995